The 2017 Appalachian State Mountaineers baseball team represented the Appalachian State University in the 2017 NCAA Division I baseball season. The Mountaineers played their home games at Beaver Field.

Schedule and results
Appalachian State announced its 2017 football schedule on November 14, 2016. The 2017 schedule consists of 19 home and 36 away games in the regular season. The Mountaineers hosted Sun Belts foes Arkansas State, Georgia State, Georgia Southern, Texas–Arlington, and Texas State and traveled to Coastal Carolina, Georgia Southern, Little Rock, Louisiana–Lafayette, and Troy.

The 2017 Sun Belt Conference Championship will be contested May 24–28 in Statesboro, Georgia, and will be hosted by Georgia Southern.

Appalachian State finished 11th in the conference which eliminated the Mountaineers to compete in the tournament which ended the season for the team.

 Rankings are based on the team's current  ranking in the Collegiate Baseball poll.

References

Appalachian State
Appalachian State Mountaineers baseball seasons
Appalachian